Luzhma is a rural locality (a settlement) in Fedovskoye Rural Settlement of Plesetsky District, Arkhangelsk Oblast, Russia. The population was 72 as of 2010. There are 6 streets.

Geography 
Luzhma is located 70 km southwest of Plesetsk (the district's administrative centre) by road. Lipakovo is the nearest rural locality.

References 

Rural localities in Plesetsky District